Chariton Township is an inactive township in Schuyler County, in the U.S. state of Missouri.

Chariton Township was erected in 1843, and named after the Chariton River.

References

Townships in Missouri
Townships in Schuyler County, Missouri
1843 establishments in Missouri